The Merry Widow is a 1918 Hungarian musical film directed by Michael Curtiz. It is based on the 1905 operetta by Franz Lehár.

Cast
 Mihály Várkonyi
 Berta Valero
 Endre Boross
 Árpád id. Latabár
 Miklós Szomory
 József Bánhidy

See also
 Michael Curtiz filmography

External links

Films directed by Michael Curtiz
1918 films
Hungarian black-and-white films
Hungarian musical films
Hungarian silent feature films
Films based on operettas